Missing You is a Hong Kong modern serial drama produced by TVB under producer Fong Chun-Chiu and starring Linda Chung, Jason Chan, Calvin Chan, Cilla Kung, and Rosina Lam.

Plot
The series revolves around the Tracing Department of a charity group named Yan Ming Federation. It is responsible for helping families locate their missing loved ones, lost due to war, natural disaster, or other factors.

The series is roughly split into six segments, each revolving around a different case. The last two cases also had a very profound impact on one of the members of the Tracing Department.

According to the 779th edition of TVB Magazine, roughly half of the cases shown in the series are based on real-life cases.

Cast

Main cast

Hong Family

Other Cast

Viewership ratings
The following is a table that includes a list of the total ratings points based on television viewership.

External links
Official Site
K for TVB

References 

TVB dramas
Serial drama television series
Costume drama television series
2012 Hong Kong television series debuts
2013 Hong Kong television series endings